The 2007 Utah Grand Prix was the fifth round of the 2007 American Le Mans Series season.  It took place on May 19, 2007.

Official results
Class winners in bold.  Cars failing to complete 70% of winner's distance marked as Not Classified (NC).

Statistics
 Pole Position - #7 Penske Racing - 2:18.128
 Fastest Lap - #7 Penske Racing - 2:21.749

External links
  

U
Utah Grand Prix